József Bordás (June 2, 1963) is a Hungarian handball player. He participated at the 1988 Summer Olympics, where the Hungarian national team placed fourth. He was a silver medalist at the 1986 World Men's Handball Championship.

References

1963 births
Living people
People from Kunhegyes
Hungarian male handball players
Olympic handball players of Hungary
Handball players at the 1988 Summer Olympics
Sportspeople from Jász-Nagykun-Szolnok County